The cross-country skiing competition of the 2010 Winter Olympics in Vancouver were held at Whistler Olympic Park. The events were held between 15 and 28 February 2010.

Medals summary

Medal table

Men's events

Women's events

Competition schedule 
All times are Pacific Standard Time (UTC-8).

Qualification 
Across the twelve cross-country skiing events, a maximum of 310 athletes are allowed to compete. No nation can have more than 20 skiers competing, with an additional limit of 12 men or 12 women per specific nation. For each event, a nation can enter four skiers in individual events and one team in relay races.

"A" Competitors with less than 100 distance FIS points will be allowed to compete in any event. Competitors with less than 120 sprint FIS points will be allowed to compete in sprint events only.

"B" Countries that do not have a skier that meets the "A" Qualification standard have the right to enter one male and one female skier in either the sprint or the 10 km (women)/ 15 km (men) on condition that the skiers competed at the FIS Nordic World Ski Championships 2009 and have a maximum of 300 FIS points in the event concerned.

A basic quota of one man and one woman was assigned to all nations competing. Each nation with a skier in the top 300 of the distance or sprint FIS points lists was allocated one additional quota place. For top 30 in the 2009-10 Cross-Country Skiing World Cup extra quota places were allocated separately for both genders, nations with two or more skiers in the top 30 earning two more skiers and nations with one skier in the top 30 earning one extra place. The remaining quotas were allocated to countries based on the FIS point allocation list. Once a nation reached the maximum of 20 slots it became ineligible to earn any more slots. Quota places not used up by the National Olympic Committees were returned to the pool and reallocated. This process started on 18 January 2006 and ran until 28 January 2010.

Participating nations 
55 countries participated in the 2010 edition.

See also 
 Cross-country skiing at the 2010 Winter Paralympics

References 

 May 2009 FIS Qualification for the 2010 Winter Olympics. - accessed 21 January 2010. Cross-country skiing is on pages 4–6.
 

 
2010 Winter Olympics
2010 Winter Olympics events
Olympics
Cross-country skiing competitions in Canada